A luxury apartment is a type of apartment that is intended to provide its occupant with higher-than-average levels of comfort, quality and convenience. While the term is often used to describe high-end regular apartments, or even typical apartments as a form of aspirational marketing, a true luxury apartment is one that is variously defined as being in the top 10% of transactions on the market, or having a total value of more than $4–5 million US dollars, with "ultra-luxury" apartments being valued above US$10 million. However, it can also mean any apartment with extra amenities, such as a doorman, yoga studios or bowling alleys, among others.

History 
The term "luxury apartment" was used since the postwar era, although its definition was less grandiose than in recent times. In the 1980s, for example, having a doorman for the building was sufficient to mark an apartment as "luxury". Competition to make the most luxurious apartment increased due to the growth of the Internet, which allowed potential buyers to cross-check apartment listings.

Current examples

Americas

New York

As of 2016, three out of every four new apartment buildings in New York City were luxury designs targeted towards high-end buyers. This luxury boom is centered in the fastest-growing American cities, but also includes smaller, less-dense cities. It has been linked to the movement of affluent Americans away from suburbs to cities, also known as The Great Inversion.

The 2010s was marked by the construction of many new luxury condominium towers in New York City, often appealing to wealthy overseas buyers, such as One57 and Central Park Tower. Billionaire's Row became known as the location of many of these towers. Williamsburg, Brooklyn had the highest rent increase, rising by 54% on average from 2010 to 2019. Global economic headwinds and unfavorable changes to property and transfer taxes cooled demand, causing a glut of unsold luxury condos. As of 2019, one in four luxury apartments that were built since 2013 were unsold.

Europe

London

Luxury apartments in London comprise at least around 1,000 sq ft of space and would include high specification fittings such as underfloor heating, air conditioning, marble bathrooms, kitchens with granite or quartz worktops, underground carparks and/or garages, a 24 hour concierge service and an on-site residents-only leisure centre.

Asia

Hong Kong

Hong Kong has long been recognised as one of the most expensive property markets in the world, with countless exclusive residential offerings. Though many of the city's famed apartment complexes are found atop the Victoria Peak, there are several other luxury apartments in areas such as Repulse Bay, Mid-Levels, Union Square, Kowloon Tong and more.

See also 
 Penthouse apartment
 Executive home
 McMansion

References 

Housing
House types
Residential real estate
Real estate terminology
Apartment types